Lagostominae is a subfamily of the family Chinchillidae. It contains the genus Lagostomus and two extinct genera, Prolagostomus and Pliolagostomus.

References

Chinchillidae